Tressel may refer to:

 Jim Tressel (born 1952), American football coach
 Lee Tressel (1925–1981), American football coach
 Markus Tressel (born 1977), German politician
 A character in the play Richard III
 Stackton Tressel, a fictional English village

See also 
 Tressell (disambiguation)
 Tressel Field
 Trestle bridge, a type of bridge
 Trestle table, an item of furniture
 Trestles, a surf spot